Allan Berry (6 November 1902 – 17 September 1974) was a South African cricketer. He played in four first-class matches for Border in 1925/26 and 1926/27.

See also
 List of Border representative cricketers

References

External links
 

1902 births
1974 deaths
South African cricketers
Border cricketers